Einar Liberg (16 October 1873 – 9 September 1955) was a Norwegian rifle shooter who competed in the early 20th century. He won the gold medal with the Norwegian 300 metre free rifle team at the 1908 Summer Olympics in London, and four years later at the 1912 Summer Olympics in Stockholm he won the silver medal with the free rifle team. At the 1920 Summer Olympics in Antwerp he competed in running deer, and won two gold medals in team, running deer, single shot, and team, running deer, double shot. He also took the individual bronze medal in running deer, double shot. In the 1924 Summer Olympics in Paris he ended his long olympic career by taking another gold medal in team, running deer, single shot, and a silver medal in team, running deer, double shot.

References

External links
profile

1873 births
1955 deaths
Norwegian male sport shooters
ISSF rifle shooters
Olympic gold medalists for Norway
Olympic silver medalists for Norway
Olympic bronze medalists for Norway
Olympic shooters of Norway
Shooters at the 1908 Summer Olympics
Shooters at the 1912 Summer Olympics
Shooters at the 1920 Summer Olympics
Shooters at the 1924 Summer Olympics
Olympic medalists in shooting
Medalists at the 1908 Summer Olympics
Medalists at the 1912 Summer Olympics
Medalists at the 1920 Summer Olympics
Medalists at the 1924 Summer Olympics
People from Elverum
Sportspeople from Innlandet
20th-century Norwegian people